The Huey P. Long Bridge, located in Jefferson Parish, Louisiana, is a cantilevered steel through-truss bridge that carries a two-track railroad line over the Mississippi River at mile 106.1, with three lanes of US 90 on each side of the central tracks. It is several kilometers upriver from the city of New Orleans. The East Bank entrance is at Elmwood, Louisiana, and the West Bank at Bridge City.

Opened in December 1935, the bridge was named for the late Governor Huey P. Long, who was assassinated on September 8 of that year. The bridge was the first Mississippi River span built in Louisiana and the 29th along the length of the river. It was designed by Polish-American engineer Ralph Modjeski and is designated as a National Historic Civil Engineering Landmark by the American Society of Civil Engineers.

On June 16, 2013, a $1.2 billion widening project by the Louisiana Department of Transportation and Development was completed and opened to motorists. The bridge now consists of three  lanes in each direction, with inside and outside shoulders. Prior to the expansion, there were two  lanes in each direction with no shoulders. In both cases, the road lanes flanked the twin railroad tracks contained within the truss.

in 2014, a writer in The New Yorker described the bridge as "a structure so vaulting and high that it seems to extend from one white, towering Gulf Coast cloud to the next."

Structure

There are three navigation channels below the bridge, the widest being . Normally, bridges its height have a hump, but this bridge was designed flat to facilitate rail traffic.

The bridge is a favorite railfan location. It is owned by the New Orleans Public Belt Railroad, which is owned by the City of New Orleans and managed by the Public Belt Railroad Commission. The bridge was hated by many drivers in the New Orleans area due to the narrow  lanes without shoulders before it was widened. Additionally, where the East Bank approach met the superstructure of the bridge, the two vehicular roadways "jogged" or shifted inwards towards the bridge centerline about  since the through-truss portion of the superstructure was  wider than the deck truss portion of the east approach.

The foundation of the bridge is also unique. The land in and around New Orleans was formed by silt deposits brought down the Mississippi River. The clay topsoil, known colloquially as "gumbo soil," is compressible and unsuitable for foundation loads.

The bridge dates from an era when large bridges mixing rail tracks and highways were common, as typified by the MacArthur Bridge and McKinley Bridge in St. Louis, Missouri, and the Harahan Bridge in Memphis, Tennessee. A second Huey P. Long Bridge, which is very similar to the design of this bridge in New Orleans before its renovation, was built further upstream in 1940 in Baton Rouge, Louisiana. While both of the Long bridges still carry both types of traffic, most of the others have been converted either to entirely rail use (Harahan since 1949, MacArthur since 1981) or exclusive road use (McKinley since 1978), sometimes with bicycle and/or pedestrian use added (McKinley in 2007, Harahan in 2016).

History

As early as 1892 the Southern Pacific Railway proposed a high-level bridge, but a depression that year prevented further work on a project that would have been an overwhelming challenge for the engineers of the time due to soil conditions and extremely high clearances for river navigation. With the development of the Public Belt Railroad, interest in a river rail crossing grew and led to passage of a constitutional amendment in 1916 granting the city exclusive power to build and operate a crossing. Three general ideas emerged from the planning process: a low-level drawbridge, a tunnel, and a high-level bridge. The tunnel idea died first because it would have provided limited capacity and the War Department (after years of wrangling) ultimately rejected the idea of a drawbridge as too problematic for such a significant concentration of vital transportation infrastructure.

Work on the design of the bridge began in earnest in 1925 by the engineering firm of Modjeski and Masters. Some pilings were actually driven that year to prevent expiration of congressional authority and provide further information for the design. As the magnitude of the project became apparent and projected costs ballooned, financing difficulties compounded by the Great Depression delayed the project. Finally, on November 5, 1932, the bonds of the Public Belt Railroad Commission were guaranteed by a complex agreement between the Southern Pacific Railroad, the City of New Orleans and the State of Louisiana. Principal construction contracts were signed on December 30, 1932, and work formally started the following day. Construction of the bridge proceeded smoothly over a three-year period with only minor interruptions due to high water and a one-month strike in September 1933.

Expansion
The Huey P. Long Bridge Widening Project is a TIMED (Transportation Infrastructure Model for Economic Development) Program project. The TIMED Program was created by Act 16 of the 1989 Louisiana Legislature, was voted for by the people and is the single largest transportation program in state history. The Program is designed to enhance economic development in Louisiana through an investment in transportation projects.

The $1.2 billion widening project started in April 2006 and is the first change to the structure since it opened in 1935. The project expanded the highway on each side of the structure from two  lanes to three  lanes with a  inside shoulder and an  outside shoulder. It also included new signalized intersections to replace the traffic circles at Jefferson Highway and at Bridge City Avenue, both in Jefferson Parish, Louisiana.

Project details
This seven-year-long, four-phase project was completed in 2013. The timeline of the project was as follows:

Phase I: Main support widening (piers)
In this phase, completed in May 2009, four river piers and one land pier were widened to support the additional lanes. Reinforcing framework and concrete filled the void sections of the piers to strengthen them. In addition, w-shaped metal bridge struts were anchored to the upper part of each pier to support the additional new trusses and the existing truss.

Phase II: Railroad modifications
In October 2006, work to relocate five selected railroad supports was done to facilitate the construction of the new approaches. This phase was completed in June 2008.

Phase III: Main bridge widening (truss)
Completed in 2012, this phase widened the existing truss on either side to accommodate new travel lanes and shoulders.
The bridge, which is composed of four spans, was erected one span at a time. In November 2009, construction of the West Bank Anchor Span began by using the stick-built method, meaning each element of the span was individually placed. In order to minimize the use of falsework and river closures in the navigation or auxiliary channels, the three remaining spans were done through the span-by-span method. This method involved large barges transporting a pre-assembled span section, positioning it under the bridge, and lifting it into position using strand jacks. Temporary stability frames made up of floorbeams and towers were used to support each span section during the lifting process.

This phase was completed on April 29, 2012, when traffic was shifted from the original lanes (two  lanes in each direction, cantilevered on each side of the original truss) to two temporary lanes in each direction on the widened portion of the truss.

Phase IV: New approaches construction
During this phase of the project, the two temporary lanes were widened to three  lanes in each direction with  shoulders and  inside shoulders. The traffic circles at each end of the bridge were replaced with signalized intersections. Also, new roadway and elevated structures were constructed.

Four cameras were installed to view the approaches and ramps construction – two on the East Bank of Jefferson Parish and two on the West Bank of Jefferson Parish.

On February 5, 2013, Louisiana Department of Transportation and Development Secretary Sherri LeBas announced that the bridge would be fully open to drivers on June 16, 2013.

See also

List of bridges documented by the Historic American Engineering Record in Louisiana
List of bridges in the United States
List of crossings of the Lower Mississippi River
List of longest bridges
Huey P. Long Bridge (Baton Rouge)

References

External links

Original construction
Mississippi River Bridge at New Orleans, Louisiana – Final Report to the Public Belt Railroad Commission of the City of New Orleans (1941)

2006 road widening project
Huey P. Long Bridge Widening Project, Louisiana DOTD (June 2007) (archived copy).
, HNTB, August 9, 2011. Seven-minute animation of erection of trusses widening river spans to enlarge roadway.
, May 11, 2012. Seventeen-minute-long video taken from the westbound Sunset Limited as it climbs the east bank viaduct, crosses the truss spans as construction continues on the new road lanes while old  carriageways are still in use, and then descends the west bank viaduct to its landing.
, April 11, 2016. Fifteen-minute-long video very similar to 2012 video linked immediately above, showing completed highway lanes.

General

Bridges over the Mississippi River
Railroad bridges in Louisiana
Road-rail bridges in the United States
Road bridges in Louisiana
Steel bridges in the United States
Truss bridges in the United States
Bridges completed in 1935
Buildings and structures in Jefferson Parish, Louisiana
Transportation in Jefferson Parish, Louisiana
Bridges of the United States Numbered Highway System
U.S. Route 90
Huey Long
Cantilever bridges in the United States
Historic American Engineering Record in Louisiana
Historic Civil Engineering Landmarks